The 2016–17 UTSA Roadrunners men's basketball team represented the University of Texas at San Antonio during the 2016–17 NCAA Division I men's basketball season. The Roadrunners, led by first-year head coach Steve Henson, played their home games at the Convocation Center and were members of Conference USA. They finished the season 14–19, 8–10 in C-USA play to finish in the ninth place. They defeated Western Kentucky in the first round of the C-USA tournament before losing to top-seeded Middle Tennessee.

Previous season
The Roadrunners finished the season 5–27, 3–15 in C-USA play to finish in last place. They lost in the first round of the C-USA tournament to Florida Atlantic.

On March 10, 2016, after 10 years with the school, head coach Brooks Thompson was fired. He finished at UTSA with a record of 130–176. On April 1, the school hired Steve Henson as head coach.

Offseason

Departures

Incoming transfers

Class of 2016 recruits

Preseason 
The Roadrunners were picked to finish in last place in the preseason Conference USA poll.

Roster

Schedule and results

|-
!colspan=9 style=| Exhibition

|-
!colspan=9 style=| Non-conference regular season

|-
!colspan=9 style=| Conference USA regular season 

|-
!colspan=9 style=| Conference USA tournament

References

UTSA Roadrunners men's basketball seasons
UTSA
UTSA Roadrunners
UTSA Roadrunners